Megachile mixtura is a species of bee in the family Megachilidae. It was described by Eardley & R. P. Urban in 2005.

References

Mixtura
Insects described in 2005